McKellar is a surname.

McKellar may also refer to:

 McKellar, Australian Capital Territory, a suburb of Canberra
 McKellar, Ontario, a township in Canada
 The southern branch of the Kaministiquia River delta, known as the "McKellar River"
 McKellar (crater), a lunar impact crater on the far side of the Moon